The Double Conscious: Race & Rhetoric is a 2011 educational documentary compilation of speeches, by a number of prominent figures, dealing with race and racism in America.

Speeches
Atlanta Exposition Speech by Booker T. Washington
Civil Rights Address by John F. Kennedy 
I Have a Dream by Martin Luther King Jr.
Oxford Union Debate by Malcolm X
"Can We All Get Along?" by Rodney King 
"The Day of Jerusalem's Fall" by Jeremiah Wright 
A More Perfect Union (speech) by Barack Obama
Department of Justice African American History Month Remarks by Eric Holder

References

"Atlanta Compromise Speech". New Georgia Encyclopedia. Archived from the original on 8 July 2007. Retrieved 2007-06-08.
Stanton's ode began with "Behold To-Day the Meeting of the Lands" (see "South's New Epoch" article from the New York World, 1895 September 18, in the Papers of Booker T. Washington 1895-1898, pp. 3–15).
Booker T. Washington, Up from Slavery (Lexington: Tribeca Books, 2013), p. 106-07.
Louis R. Harlan, Booker T. Washington: The Making of a Black Leader, 1856-1901 (New York: Oxford University Press, 1972)
Smith, Kathy B. (1994). The White House speaks, Greenwood Publishing Group, p. 148.
Dallek, Robert (2003). An Unfinished Life: John F. Kennedy, 1917–1963, Little, Brown Publishing, pp. 602–606.
Hansen, D, D. (2003). The Dream: Martin Luther King, Jr., and the Speech that Inspired a Nation. New York, NY: Harper Collins. p. 177.
I Have a Dream: Martin Luther King Jr. and the Future of Multicultural America, James Echols - 2004
Alexandra Alvarez, "Martin Luther King's "I Have a Dream" : The Speech Event as Metaphor", Journal of Black Studies 18(3); accessed via SagePub, .
See Taylor Branch, Parting the Waters: America in the King Years 1954-1963.
Nicolaus Mills, "What Really Happened at the March on Washington?", Dissent, Summer 1988; reprinted in Civil Rights Since 1787: A Reader on the Black Struggle, ed. Jonathan Birnbaum and Clarence Taylor, New York: New York University Press, 2000.
Stephen Lucas and Martin Medhurst (December 15, 1999). ""I Have a Dream" Speech Leads Top 100 Speeches of the Century". University of Wisconsin–Madison. Retrieved 2006-07-18.
Bethune, "Malcolm X in Europe", Clarke, pp. 231–233.
Malcolm X (December 3, 1964). "Malcolm X Oxford Debate". Malcolm X: A Research Site. Retrieved July 30, 2008.
Video of Rodney King's Plea during the 1992 Los Angeles Riots From YouTube. Retrieved June 18, 2012. The line has been often misquoted as, "Can we all just get along?" or "Can't we all just get along?" King did not use the word "just" or "Can't" in his original statement.
Obama's Pastor: God Damn America, U.S. to Blame for 9/11 Brian Ross and Rehab el-Buri, ABC News, March 13, 2008
Dilanian, Ken (2008-03-18). "Defenders say Wright has love, righteous anger for USA". USA Today. Retrieved 2008-04-02.
"'A more perfect union' by Barack Obama". The Los Angeles Times. 2008-03-19. Archived from the original on 2008-06-08. Retrieved 2008-03-22.
Barack Obama (2008-03-18). "Text of Obama's speech: A More Perfect Union". Wall Street Journal. Archived from the original on 20 March 2008. Retrieved 2008-03-18.
Nedra Pickler and Matt Apuzzo (2008-03-18). "Obama confronts racial division". Associated Press. Archived from the original on 2008-03-25. Retrieved 2008-04-04.
"Remarks as Prepared for Delivery by Attorney General Eric Holder at the Department of Justice African American History Month Program". U.S. Department of Justice. February 18, 2009.
Mitchell, Mary (February 19, 2009). "Attorney General Eric Holder's race speech stirs debate". The Chicago Sun-Times.
Hornick, Ed (February 19, 2009). "Holder 'nation of cowards' remarks blasted, praised". CNN.

External links

2011 films
Documentary films about racism in the United States
Documentary films about race and ethnicity
2010s English-language films